EastIndo is a charter airline based in Jakarta, Indonesia. Eastindo is listed in category 2 by Indonesian Civil Aviation Authority for airline safety quality.

Destinations

Dumai - Pinang Kampai Airport
Jakarta - Halim Perdanakusuma Airport
Medan - Kualanamu International Airport
Pangkalan Kerinci - Sultan Syarief Haroen Setia Negara Airport
Pekanbaru - Sultan Syarif Kasim II International Airport
Singapore - Seletar Airport
Surabaya - Juanda International Airport

Fleet
The EastIndo fleets includes the following aircraft (as of May 2017): 

 2 Beechcraft B1900D
 2 Britten-Norman Islander
 2 Airbus Helicopter AS350

References

External links
Official website
EastIndo Fleet

Airlines of Indonesia